April Kepner, M.D., F.A.C.S. is a fictional character from the ABC's medical drama series Grey's Anatomy. The character was created by series producer Shonda Rhimes and is portrayed by actress Sarah Drew. She was introduced in the episode "Invasion" as a surgical resident from Mercy West Medical Center who joins the staff at Seattle Grace Mercy West after the two hospitals merge to compensate for the absence of some of the central cast members, and was created to be disliked by her colleagues. The character was originally set to appear in two episodes but Drew's contract was extended to the remainder of the sixth season, with her becoming a series regular in the seventh season. The character's main storylines involved her professional struggles, her religious beliefs. She married Jackson Avery and had two children: a son, Samuel, who died of osteogenesis imperfecta type II, and a daughter named Harriet. The character's story concluded with the 14th season. It was revealed in season 17 that April Kepner left Seattle with Jackson Avery to run the Catherine Fox foundation. 

Although initially focusing on neurosurgery during her residency due to her crush on Derek Shepherd, April Kepner finally settles on trauma surgery as a specialty. After failing her boards, April Kepner departs but returns as a surgical attending when Chief Owen Hunt offers her job back. ABC noted her determination, thoroughness, and intelligence as her main traits, while her insecurity, over-eagerness and vulnerability were highlighted as her main weakness. The character initially received mixed reviews from critics, but later praise was affirmed from her character growth, eventually becoming a fan-favorite.

Storylines 
April Kepner was born in Columbus, Ohio. Her mother Karen is a teacher, and her father Joe is a farmer, and she is the second of four daughters. Kepner is initially a surgical resident at Mercy West Medical Center. She joins the staff at Seattle Grace Mercy West after the merger of the two hospitals, alongside Jackson Avery (Jesse Williams), Reed Adamson (Nora Zehetner), and Charles Percy (Robert Baker). April is first shown to possess a red diary, in which she writes all her feelings and thoughts which is stolen by Lexie Grey (Chyler Leigh). Lexie uses the personal information written in the notebook to unnerve and blackmail Kepner but later apologizes. After she made a mistake that led to a patient's death, she is fired. However, Derek Shepherd (Patrick Dempsey) rehires her when he becomes the new Chief of Surgery. As she is not confident anymore, she spends her time doing errands for Shepherd and develops a crush on him, earning her the nickname "Shepherd's flunky". In the season six finale, she discovers the body of her best friend Reed Adamson, who has been shot. She later runs into the shooter, Gary Clark, who spares her after she tells him about her life. Following the shooting, April and fellow resident Jackson Avery move into Meredith Grey's (Ellen Pompeo) house.

April reveals that she is a virgin because she is a Christian and made a promise to God to stay a virgin until she was married. She shows potential as a trauma surgeon during a trauma drill. She develops feelings for Alex Karev (Justin Chambers) who almost makes her lose her virginity. When Jackson, now her best friend finds out about this, he assaults Alex. Later, April agrees to go on a date with Robert Stark, believing him to have a good side. Her fellow residents make fun of her which prompts her to break up with him. April also impresses Owen Hunt (Kevin McKidd) and she is ultimately granted the position of Chief Resident in the season seven finale. Many become upset with Owen’s decision. April initially struggles with her new status as her fellow doctors do not listen to her and do not take her seriously.

As the end of the fifth year of residency is near, the surgical residents, including April, prepare for their boards exams for the different fellowships they plan on joining. The night before taking the exam, April loses her virginity to Jackson which causes her to re-evaluate her faith during her Boards Exams, making the examiners feel uncomfortable. It is revealed that she is the only one out of the residents to have failed her Boards Exams. She receives phone calls from other hospital retracting their offers of fellowships and is laid off from Seattle Grace. Although Jackson has true feelings for her, April pushes him away because she believes that he feels guilty for having sex with her. As a celebration of the conclusion of their residencies, the former chief of surgery Richard Webber (James Pickens, Jr.) organizes his annual dinner for them. The eighth season ends with April, Jackson, Alex, and Richard waiting for Meredith and Cristina, who are victims of an aviation accident.

In season 9, months later, Owen goes to visit April, who had moved back to her parents' farm in Moline, Ohio. In the wake of the tragic aviation accident, he offers her an attending position at the hospital. When she gets back to Seattle Grace, she resumes her sexual relationship with Jackson, despite claiming she wants to re-virginise. April has a pregnancy scare and Jackson promises that he will be there every step of the way, even marry her, if she tests positive. When April finds out that she is not pregnant, she is overjoyed, but inadvertently hurts Jackson's feelings by saying that they dodged a bullet, seemingly thrilled that they don't have to get married anymore. Jackson breaks up with April. April suggests to Jackson that they each take a date to Bailey's wedding in an attempt to move on. Jackson takes intern Stephanie; the two bond and eventually have sex. When Jackson tells April that he is sleeping with somebody else, she is visibly crushed and tells him that they can't be friends again until she has gotten over him. In the next episode, a very attractive paramedic named Matthew (Justin Bruening) asks April out for coffee and they start seeing each other. Shortly afterwards she turns to Jackson for dating advice and it is hinted that Jackson is still in love with her when he shows signs of jealousy but they re-establish their friendship. She confesses to Matthew that she is not a virgin anymore as she led him to believe and he breaks up with her because she lied to him. However, in the next episode, Matthew forgives April and they get back together. He asks her to marry him through a flash mob and she says yes. In the season 9 finale, April thinks she lost Jackson when a bus blew up and tells him she loves him, but he only has a few injuries. 

In season 10, April is still engaged to Matthew while Jackson dates Stephanie. At the wedding, Jackson realizes he still loves April and stands up professing his love. Jackson and April are seen driving off together at the start of the following episode and later, it is revealed that they have secretly gotten married after they ran off together. At first, April and Jackson do not tell their friends about their marriage, but later they do because of a new rule at the hospital. Catherine Avery is not at all happy about her son's elopement with April, and the fact that there wasn't a prenuptial agreement. They soon make up after April signs a postnuptial agreement. 

In season 11, Jackson and April hit a rough patch when they realize that they have different views in the way their children should be raised religious. Not long after their fight, April realizes she is pregnant. April and Jackson's baby is diagnosed during pregnancy with a sickness that causes the babies bones to break, which is called Osteogenesis Imperfecta type 2, and learn that the baby will not survive long after birth. Jackson believes that termination is the best option, however April would rather give birth to the baby knowing it will not live very long. They scheduled an induction for the next day, at the beginning of the appointment they are asked to sign their baby's death certificate, which is too hard for the couple to bear. April doesn't sign the papers and returns to work the same day, praying for a miracle. They decide to give birth to the baby via induction at 24 weeks gestation having it baptized right then. She gives birth to a boy, named Samuel Norbert Avery, and he died a few hours after birth because of his sickness. In the following weeks after Samuel's death, April and Jackson find it hard to be around each other and be intimate with one another. After April tries to seduce Jackson in a supply closet, Jackson asks if she is sure she wants this so soon after the death of their son, leaving April to storm out in anger. In the season 11 finale, April decides to join Owen Hunt for three months as a trauma surgeon with the army; this not being well received by Jackson. But after April states she needs this in order to grieve Samuel, Jackson lets her leave. Over the following months, April lengthens her stay in the army, this having a strain on her and Jackson's marriage as Jackson can rarely get a hold of her. On Christmas Day after already being away for some time, April announces to Jackson while on video chat that she is staying for a longer service period, but the conversation is cut short by sounds of gunfire and explosions from April's base camp, leaving her to terminate the call; meanwhile Jackson is unsure whether his wife is hurt. On Valentine's Day, April returns to the hospital surprising Jackson, and they embrace in the foyer.

In season 12, April and Jackson go through divorce proceedings started by Jackson. The morning before they sign the divorce papers, April discovers that she is expecting a second baby. She does not inform Jackson, and he is told by Arizona Robbins, which leads to additional tension. After Catherine Avery convinces Jackson to fight for full custody of his unborn child, April takes out a restraining order against him. The Averys' lawyer asks for all documentation of their marriage and Jackson realizes that they should fix the situation for their child. He and April decide to raise their child together as friends. Complications arise when April needs a C-section and Warren has to do it, without anesthesia or other medications.

In seasons 13 and 14, April faces a crisis of faith as she believes that good people get punished and bad people get good things. She does this after treating 3 seemingly simple patients who are good people and die, including Matthew's pregnant wife, after delivery. Robbins then tells April it's her fault. As a result, she goes into a dark place and uses partying and sex to mask her deep-rooted pain. She earns the nickname "The Party" by the new interns. She refuses to let Jackson help her through this time. However, in mid-season 14, she encounters a terminal patient who helps April reaffirm her faith. April starts seeing Matthew again and their relationship is made public when the two are involved in a car accident, where April almost dies of hypothermia, after April finally wakes up from her coma after Jackson prays for her, her friends are relieved. In the season finale, April and Matthew get married. She resigns from the hospital to provide much-needed medical care for the homeless communities in Seattle, something she and Matthew had been doing together on a voluntary basis. 

In season 17, it is revealed that April has separated from Matthew. When Jackson decides to resign from the hospital and take over the Catherine Fox Foundation, April decides to go with him and Harriet, and the three of them depart Seattle for Boston. In the following season, she and Jackson visit Seattle and it is revealed that the two of them have reconciled.

Development

Casting and creation

Drew was cast in late September 2009 and first appeared on the show in the fifth episode of the sixth season as one of the residents from the Mercy West Medical Center after its merger with Seattle Grace. Drew was brought aboard Grey's Anatomy after former collaborations with the Series' producer and creator Shonda Rhimes; she was formally featured as a guest in two episodes of Private Practice in 2008 and was one of the main cast in Rhimes television pilot Inside the Box (2009) which was eventually not picked up by ABC. Her casting came after the absence of some of the central cast members, notably Katherine Heigl departure after her maternity leave and Ellen Pompeo's absence due to pregnancy.

Drew was originally contracted to guest star in a multi-episodes story arc where her character would be eventually fired from the series after two episodes. She explained: "I came on to the show and I was told from day one that I was only going to be there for two episodes. I did not expect anything beyond that. The morning my firing episode aired, my agent got a call that they were talking about a contract and I was just completely floored." However she was promoted to a series regular on June 9, 2010 for the seventh season of the show. Rhimes said in the wake of the news: "Kepner has really been folded into the group" of Grey's Anatomy adding "It'll depend on what the studio and the network decide to do with those actors, but I fully advocate to have [the characters]". Drew received the call for her promotion the morning after the sixth episode of season six was telecast on October 29, 2009. She described the call as a "totally happy surprise".

Characterization

Drew's character has been called intelligent, hardworking, thorough and determined by Grey's Anatomy executives. But she is also considered vulnerable, insecure, sensitive and overly eager by her colleagues. Of the character, Drew said: "April is a very, very good doctor. She really knows what she's doing, she's worked really hard, and she certainly wants to do her best and stick around."  but also described her as "annoying", "neurotic" and "really insecure". In the eighth season, April's position as chief resident and her struggle to get a handle on her fellow residents formed the central arc of her storyline. Rhimes explained: "Watching April try to be in charge of Cristina and Alex and Jackson is a pretty impossible task, and it's made for comedy, it's one of the funniest things we're working on this season." One of Kepner's central characteristics are her religious beliefs, notably her chastity and her instance on saving herself for someone she truly loves. In an interview, Drew assessed that: "There certainly has never been a 28-year-old virgin on Grey's. I don't even think there's been a 28-year-old virgin on television. Unless it's someone who is sort of a recluse. A normal, smart, doctor....pretty, healthy...that in and of itself is really fascinating, and really interesting, and totally different. It's neat to see someone who is just totally clueless in that area. Everyone else [On Grey' Anatomy] seems like they know exactly what they're doing. April is totally, totally clueless. Shonda told one of the directors, there are virgins that have sort of done everything else. But not April. April's really pretty much done nothing. She's completely untouched."

Relationships

Kepner entertained several relationships throughout her time on Grey's Anatomy. In her early appearances, she is introduced as the best friend and roommate of her fellow Mercy West resident, Reed Adamson. In the season six finale, when Reed is tragically murdered by Gary Clark during the shooting, April is the first to find her when she trips over her dead body. In season seven April forms a friendship with Meredith Grey and she eventually moves into her house. Ellen Pompeo offered regarding their bond: "Meredith will accept April in order to get the audience to accept her," and Drew further explained: "She's being plugged into the community. Meredith has really taken her under her wing, is really looking out for her. Having Meredith come around to April helps the audience come around to April."

She first develops a crush on Derek Shepherd in season six. Carina MacKenzie from The Los Angeles Times called it "ridiculous" and added: "April is drooling all over Chief McDreamy. Vomit. ... She's been reduced to a 12-year-old with hearts in her eyes and a painful inability to be subtle."  Drew herself was skeptical about it, saying: "The biggest thing that people did not like about my character was they thought I was a threat for the Mer/Der relationship, which I kind of found was super ridiculous ... I never saw it as anything that would ever transpire into something that might threaten them. I only saw it as a really pathetic little crush." She briefly has feelings for Alex Karev who almost makes her lose her virginity when he tries to sleep with her in "Something's Gotta Give". Wetpaint commented that Alex made her feel "worthless and unwanted when she was at her most vulnerable." Kepner also briefly dates Dr. Robert Stark, a senior pediatric surgical attending. After her fellow residents make fun of her, she breaks up with him, creating a coldness between them. However, it is Stark who recommends her as chief resident to Dr. Hunt. Drew stated: "She sees a side to Dr. Stark that he doesn't show to anyone else at the hospital, and she finds that part endearing...I think they enjoy the companionship."

In the end of season eight, Kepner starts a relationship with her best friend turned lover Jackson Avery (Williams), who she loses her virginity to and that eventually leads her to reflect on her faith and fail her boards. Critics praised the chemistry between April and Jackson. Rhimes commented on the dynamic between the two in season nine and said:  "I think it's going to be funny, sexy, and good."

Reception
Initially, Carina MacKenzie of the Los Angeles Times highly praised the characterization of Kepner. writing: "One of my favorite Mercy Westers is intern April (Sarah Drew). Her saccharine-sweet attitude and wide-eyed insincerity were hilarious, as was her super-mysterious hot pink notebook full of morale-boosting platitudes." However, she criticized the later development of her story, especially her crush on Derek Shepherd calling it "vomit" PopSugar noted similarities between Kepner and Lexie Grey, stating: "Am I the only one who thinks the new doctor is kind of like Lexie 2.0? Their dynamic reminded me of when Lexie first started and tries really hard to make nice with Mere, but gets the cold shoulder in return." Mariella Mosthof from Wetpaint stated: "Despite her obnoxious yet well-meaning tendencies, we briefly flirted with the idea of liking April's character last season, and it looks like there's plenty of opportunity for her to come back and charm us again yet again this time around." Reviewing the first part of the eight season, Courtney Morrison of TV Fanatic wrote: "Although the girl has grown in terms of likeability, her downfalls still outweigh the positives. She doesn't really bring too much to the table. She wasn't the best choice for Chief Resident; she doesn't seem to be on the same level surgical wise and she hasn't carried a story on her own that makes us care about her."

Kepner was included in TV Guide list of The Most Loathed TV Characters, adding: "The extremely neurotic April (she makes Liz Lemon look laid back) has slowly made strides with fans thanks to her personal setbacks — she lost her treasured virginity to her best friend and failed her boards — but she still has a long way to go." Entertainment Weekly also named her one of the "21 Most Annoying TV Characters Ever", commenting: "April's lightened up a little this season [season 9], but a few episodes of sympathetic behavior can't erase the painful memories of Seattle Grace-Mercy West's most irritating doctor being." TV Fanatic included her in their list of Worst Character on TV. Christina Tran commented: "Could she be any more annoying?!?" Drew stated that it was initially "hard" for her as an actress to play an unpopular character but deemed her "interesting" and when she was informed by the writers that her character would get Dr. Shepherd (Dempsey) shot in the season six finale, her reaction was: "Oh, come on, guys, really? They already hate my character, now they're going to hate her even more!"

Critics reception gradually changed positively. Entertainment Weekly noted: "April was chirpy, irritating, and immature, and her crush on Derek didn't endear her to us either. But these days, we say hooray for April; since Meredith declared that the two of them are pals, April's become a lot more tolerable, instead of being Lexie 2.0." Courtney Morrison of TVFanatic wrote: "April has grown since her character was introduced. She's no longer much less annoying than she used to be, and she's honest. A girl with principles is a girl you want to do well." and described her and Avery as "a couple for whom viewers can root". The Hollywood Reporter also remarked: "It's nice to see April with a bit of a backbone and putting Alex in his place as the newfound confidence suits her well."

References 
Specific

General

External links 
 April Kepner on IMDb
April Kepner at ABC.com

Grey's Anatomy characters
Fictional surgeons
Television characters introduced in 2009
Fictional characters from Ohio
Fictional female doctors
American female characters in television